ORP General Haller was a  originally built for the Imperial Russian Navy. She was later acquired by the Polish Navy and served until sunk during the Invasion of Poland on 6 September 1939.

History
General Haller was built at Ab Crichton in Turku, Finland, for the Imperial Russian Navy. She was bought by the Polish Navy in 1921 and subsequently served as a school ship and minelayer. In Poland, she was classified as kanonierka (gunboat).

On 1 September 1939, under the command of Captain Stanisław Mieszkowski, General Haller was patrolling the port of Gdynia, where she was damaged in air attacks. On 2 September, the gunboat was sent to the naval port at Hel. There she was turned into a floating battery, until on 3 September, after major bomb damage, all the guns were stripped and added to the defences on land. She was left floating until she was sunk on 6 September.

References

Naval ships of Poland
Ships sunk by German aircraft
World War II shipwrecks in the Baltic Sea
Ships built in Turku
1916 ships
Maritime incidents in September 1939
Shipwrecks of Poland